Trophy Kids is a 2013 film directed by Christopher Bell. It depicts a number of families where parents push their children excessively in sport. The film premiered on HBO on December 4, 2013.

Synopsis
From the director of the film Bigger, Stronger, Faster* comes an intense look at the overbearing parents in sports. The film asks the question "Do we want what's best for our children? Or do we just want them to be the best?" Parts of this film were used in the premier of Peter Berg's HBO series State of Play.

Cast

Reception
The documentary received positive reviews as it shined a light on the struggles and stresses that these children face.

References

External links

2013 television films
2013 films
American television films
American documentary films
2013 documentary films
2010s English-language films
2010s American films